Jennifer O’Leary is a camogie player, winner of eight All-Star awards in 2004, 2005, 2006, 2007,  2011, 2012, 2013 and 2014  . She won All Ireland medals with Cork in 2002, 2005, 2006  and 2014  and National League medals in 2003, 2006, 2007, when her late point secured victory for Cork, 2012 and 2013. With a total of 2-38 she was the third highest scoring player in the Senior Championship of 2011.

Career
She played on the University of Limerick team that won three Ashbourne Cup titles in a row in 2004, 2005, and 2006.

Return
She returned to the Cork panel in 2010 after a break of two years in Australia.

References

Living people
Cork camogie players
Year of birth missing (living people)
UL GAA camogie players